Apolipoprotein A-I-binding protein also known as APOA1BP is a protein that in humans is encoded by the APOA1BP gene.

Function 

APOA1BP binds to APOA1, APOA2, and high-density lipoprotein (HDL). In addition, APOA1BP appears to play a role in sperm capacitation.

References